Finest Hour is the 2017 European barbershop quartet champion. The quartet also won the 2016 British barbershop quartet championship in Harrogate in May 2016. Finest Hour went to Las Vegas for the international competition in 2017, placing 28th in the world. Since then, their qualifying score of 83%, the UK record for a male quartet, scored in May 2018 in Harrogate, qualified them again to represent the British Association of Barbershop Singers (BABS) at the  Barbershop Harmony Society (BHS)'s 2019 international competition held in Salt Lake City, where they placed 22nd.

History 
The three Williams brothers – James (tenor), Eddie (lead), and Nick (baritone) – have sung together from a young age, and had sung with their father, Nigel Williams (bass), as a quartet named "Homespun". Homespun competed at the BABS Conventions for many years, placing third in 2013. They were a crowd favourite but over time Nigel decided to step down. In 2014, Phil Cuthbert, a long-time family friend, stepped in to help form their new quartet, "Finest Hour". After placing third in their first national competition in 2015, they went on to win the gold medal in Harrogate in May 2016 with a record-high score of 82.9 per cent.

In October 2016, Finest Hour was the guest quartet at the Irish Association of Barbershop Singers (IABS) Convention held in Cork. In April 2017, Finest Hour performed in a concert at Loughborough College.

At the May 2017 BABS national convention in Bournemouth, Finest Hour scored 81.8 per cent, the highest by a quartet that weekend, and qualified to compete at the July 2018 BHS International Convention in Orlando, Florida.

The quartet qualified for the  Barbershop Harmony Society (BHS) International Convention in Las Vegas in 2017 and, in their first time representing the  British Association of Barbershop Singers (BABS), placed 28th out of 55 quartets across the world who reached that level of competition.

In October 2017, Finest Hour competed at the European Barbershop Convention, representing BABS, where they achieved 1st place with a score of 79.4%. After this contest, Cuthbert decided to step down and Jonathan Pipe, a fellow singer with The Grand Central Chorus in Nottingham, transitioned to the quartet's bass voice part. Pipe had previously sung with the 'House Lights Up' quartet in Spain, which placed third at the Spanish Association of Barbershop Singers convention in Benalmádena in 2015. The official bass handover took place at the BABS prelims competition in November 2017. Notably, in May 2018, Finest Hour were asked to be the guest quartet at the Sweet Adelines Quartet of Nations Region 31  convention at the Sage Gateshead. Finest Hour attended the BABS 2018 convention in Harrogate, Pipe's first ever time competing on the quartet stage in the UK, to compete for a qualifying score for the 2019 international competition. The new rules meant the highest scoring quartet of the weekend gained automatic qualification, which Finest Hour won with a UK record score of 83%.

At the BHS international competition at Salt Lake City in July 2019, Finest Hour placed 22nd out of 57 quartets at that level, only one scoring point behind their nearest competitor, and just thirteen points away from becoming the second British quartet in history (after Reckless in 2017) to make the International semi-finals.

Contest placement

BABS National

BHS International

European Convention

Recordings 
This Is Us – (2016)

Notes

External links 
 Finest Hour on Facebook
 Finest Hour on YouTube
 British Association of Barbershop Singers
 Barbershop Harmony Society

2014 establishments in England
Barbershop quartets
British Association of Barbershop Singers
British vocal groups